Gustav Ahnelöv (born 22 April 1996) is a Swedish ice hockey player currently playing with Huddinge IK of the Hockeyettan. He previously played with Karlskrona HK of the Swedish Hockey League and the Coventry Blaze of the United Kingdom's Elite Ice Hockey League.

Ahnelöv made his Swedish Hockey League debut playing with Karlskrona HK during the 2015-16 SHL season.

References

External links

1996 births
Coventry Blaze players
Karlskrona HK players
Living people
IK Oskarshamn players
Ice hockey people from Stockholm
Swedish ice hockey defencemen
Västerviks IK players
HC Vita Hästen players